Mademoiselle Chiffon is a 1919 French silent film directed by André Hugon and starring Musidora as Chiffon, a Parisian milliner.  Suzanne Munte and  co-starred in the film.

Cast
 Musidora as Chiffon  
 Suzanne Munte as Mademoiselle Dubois 
 Kitty Hott 
 René Lorsay

References

Bibliography
 Rège, Philippe. Encyclopedia of French Film Directors, Volume 1. Scarecrow Press, 2009.

External links

1919 films
Films directed by André Hugon
French silent films
French black-and-white films
1910s French films